The Glasgow-Blatchford bleeding score (GBS) is a screening tool to assess the likelihood that a person with an acute upper gastrointestinal bleeding (UGIB) will need to have medical intervention such as a blood transfusion or endoscopic intervention. The tool may be able to identify people who do not need to be admitted to hospital after a UGIB. Advantages of the GBS over the Rockall score, which assesses the risk of death in UGIB, include a lack of subjective variables such as the severity of systemic diseases and the lack of a need for oesophagogastroduodenoscopy (OGD) to complete the score, a feature unique to the GBS.

In a controlled study, 16% of people presenting with UGIB had a GBS score of "0", considered low. Among this group there were no deaths or interventions needed and people were able to be effectively treated in an outpatient setting.

Criteria 

The score is calculated using the table below:

In the validation group, scores of 6 or more were associated
with a greater than 50% risk of needing an intervention.

Score

Score is equal to "0" if the following are all present:
 Hemoglobin level > 12.9 g/dL (men) or > 11.9 g/dL (women)
 Systolic blood pressure > 109 mm Hg
 Pulse < 100/minute
 Blood urea nitrogen level < 6.5 mmol/L
 No melena or syncope
 No past or present liver disease or heart failure

See also
 Rockall score

References 

Medical scoring system
Gastroenterology